Virgo may refer to:

Virgo (astrology), the sixth astrological sign of the zodiac
Virgo (constellation), a constellation
Virgo Cluster, a cluster of galaxies in the constellation Virgo
Virgo Stellar Stream, remains of a dwarf galaxy
Virgo Supercluster, a galactic supercluster
Virgo interferometer, a European gravitational-wave telescope

Arts
Virgo (film), a 1970 Egyptian film
Virgo (comics), a Marvel Comics character
Virgos Merlot, or Virgos, an American rock band
Virgo (album), by Virgo Four, 1989
"Virgo", a song by Atmosphere from Mi Vida Local, 2018

Other uses
Virgo (moth), a genus of moth
Virgo (software), an open source Java application server
Virgo (surname)
Aqua Virgo, one of the 11 aqueducts supplied the city of ancient Rome
SuperStar Virgo, a mega cruise ship operated and owned by Star Cruises
USS Virgo (AKA-20), a United States Navy attack cargo ship
Virgin Mary